Qavamabad-e Chichaklu (also Romanized as Qavāmābād-e Chīchaklū; also known as ChīChaklū, Chūchaklū, and Lakāh) is a village in Banesh Rural District, Beyza District, Sepidan County, Fars Province, Iran. At the 2006 census, its population was 455, in 98 families.

References 

Populated places in Beyza County